Pallig Tokesen (died 13 November 1002) was a Danish chieftain. According to the 'A' Translation of the Anglo-Saxon Chronicle he was recruited to help Ethelred II, however upon the arrival of a significant Viking force in Devon in 1001 he deserted Ethelred and instead threw in his lot with the raiders. As the Chronicle relates:

"And they went thence west until they came to Devon; and there Paley [Pallig] came to meet them, with the ships which he could gather, because he had fled from king Ethelred, contrary to all the plighted troth that he had given him; and the king had also well gifted him with houses, and with gold and with silver. And they burned Teignton, and also many other good towns which we are unable to name; and there, afterwards, peace was made with them" 

Later tradition credits him as the Earldoman of Devon however there seems to be little contemporary support for this position. Yorke only refers to him as a Viking Leader, not as an Earldoman. 

He is said to have been killed in the St. Brice's Day massacre, along with his wife Gunhilde, daughter of Harald Bluetooth of Denmark and sister of Sweyn Forkbeard. Like his rank, this appears to be a later addition. 

Sweyn's invasions from 1002 may have been partly in revenge for the murder of his sister. It has been proposed that it was actually Pallig's desertion that led to the St. Brice's Day Masscre, and that the slaughter was partly Æthelred's revenge.

Notes

1002 deaths
Danish emigrants to England
Year of birth unknown
People from Devon
10th-century births